This was the first edition of the tournament.

Sander Gillé and Joran Vliegen won the title after defeating Simone Bolelli and Daniele Bracciali 6–2, 6–2 in the final.

Seeds

Draw

References
 Main Draw

IsarOpen - Doubles